was the 11th and final daimyō of Saga Domain in Hizen Province, Kyūshū, Japan.

Biography 
Naohiro was the second son of Nabeshima Naomasa, the 10th daimyō of Saga. On the retirement of his father in 1861, Naohiro was appointed 11th (and final) daimyō of Saga Domain.

During the Boshin War of the Meiji Restoration, he led Saga’s forces as a component the Satchō Alliance in support of Emperor Meiji, after the Battle of Toba–Fushimi and fought against the Tokugawa remnants at the Battle of Ueno and in the various campaigns in northern Japan against the Ōuetsu Reppan Dōmei.

With the abolition of the han system, he surrendered his domain to the central government, and departed Japan with his two younger brothers for studies in Great Britain starting 1871. He was appointed plenipotentiary minister to Rome in 1880, and returned to Japan in 1882. During his stay in England, he was appointed as official representative of Japan to the Court of St. James's by the Japanese government. After his return to Japan, he served in various political capacities, including president of the Genrōin, advisor to Emperor Meiji (and later Emperor Taishō), and as a member of the House of Peers. He was created ) in the Peerage Act of July 7, 1884. From 1911, he was president of Kokugakuin University.

His connections with the Imperial Family of Japan were strong.  His second daughter  became the wife of Prince Nashimoto Morimasa. This marriage produced for Naohiro two granddaughters, the elder of whom named Masako who became known as Bangja, consort to the heir to the Korean Yi dynasty. Naohiro's fourth daughter named Nobuko married Tsuneo Matsudaira and one of their daughters became Princess Chichibu. She also gave birth to Ichirō Matsudaira, who married Toyoko Tokugawa, Iemasa Tokugawa's daughter, and gave birth to Tsunenari Tokugawa, the eighteenth head of the Tokugawa clan. Naoharu died in 1921, and his grave is at the Aoyama Cemetery in Tokyo.

References

External links 

 

1846 births
1921 deaths
Daimyo
Japanese diplomats
Kazoku
Members of the House of Peers (Japan)
Nabeshima clan
People of the Boshin War
People of Bakumatsu
People of Meiji-period Japan